Muhamad Fadilla Akbar (born 8 September 2001) is an Indonesian professional footballer who plays as a defensive midfielder for Liga 1 club RANS Nusantara.

Club career

RANS Cilegon
In 2021, Fadilla signed a contract with Indonesian Liga 2 club RANS Cilegon. He made his league debut on 28 September 2021 in a match against Dewa United at the Gelora Bung Karno Madya Stadium, Jakarta.

Madura United (loan)
On 7 January 2022, Fadilla signed a contract with Liga 1 club Madura United on loan from RANS Cilegon. He made his league debut in a 1–0 loss against PSM Makassar on 8 January 2022 as a substitute for Asep Berlian in the 63rd minute at the Kompyang Sujana Stadium, Denpasar.

Career statistics

Club

Notes

Honours

Club
RANS Cilegon
 Liga 2 runner-up: 2021

References

External links
 Fadilla Akbar at Soccerway
 Fadilla Akbar at Liga Indonesia

2001 births
Living people
People from Medan
Indonesian footballers
Liga 1 (Indonesia) players
Liga 2 (Indonesia) players
PSDS Deli Serdang players
RANS Nusantara F.C. players
Madura United F.C. players
Association football midfielders
Sportspeople from North Sumatra
21st-century Indonesian people